Carlo Azzolini (died 1671) was a Roman Catholic prelate who served as Bishop of Bagnoregio (1650–1671).

Biography
On 9 Dec 1649, he was appointed during the papacy of Pope Innocent X as Bishop of Bagnoregio.
On 2 Jan 1650, he was consecrated bishop by Marcantonio Franciotti, Cardinal-Priest of Santa Maria della Pace, with Giovanni Battista Rinuccini, Archbishop of Fermo, and Giambattista Spínola (seniore), Archbishop of Acerenza e Matera, serving as co-consecrators.
He served as Bishop of Bagnoregio until his death on 18 Apr 1671.

Episcopal succession
While bishop, he was the principal co-consecrator:

References

External links and additional sources
 (for Chronology of Bishops) 
 (for Chronology of Bishops) 

17th-century Italian Roman Catholic bishops
Bishops appointed by Pope Innocent X
1671 deaths